Events in the year 2018 in the European Union.

Incumbents 
 President of the European Council
 Donald Tusk
 Commission President
 Jean-Claude Juncker 
 Council Presidency 
 (Jan – Jun 2018) 
 (July – Dec 2018) 
 Parliament President
 Antonio Tajani
 High Representative
 Federica Mogherini

Events

See also 
History of the European Union
Timeline of European Union history

References 

 
Years of the 21st century in the European Union
2010s in the European Union